Reginald William Newton (26 June 1926 – 21 November 1976) was an English professional footballer who played as a goalkeeper in the Football League for Brentford and Leyton Orient.

Playing career

Leyton Orient 
A goalkeeper, Newton began his career with the Dagenham Works team and earned a move to the Football League with Leyton Orient in April 1948. He made 23 league appearances for the struggling Third Division South club during the 1948–49 season and departed Brisbane Road at the end of the campaign.

Brentford 
Newton moved across London to sign for Second Division club Brentford in July 1949, in a part-exchange for Alan Smith. Newton was a second-choice goalkeeper behind Alf Jefferies, Ted Gaskell and Gerry Cakebread for much of his time at Griffin Park, but was first-choice during the 1953–54 season and made 42 appearances in a campaign which saw the Bees relegated to the Third Division South. Newton left the club in February 1957, having made 87 appearances in just under eight years with Brentford. Nonetheless, his service to the club was recognised when he was awarded the share of the benefits from a testimonial match shared with George Bristow, Ken Horne and Billy Sperrin in 1956.

Later career 
Newton dropped into non-League football to sign for Kent League First Division club Tunbridge Wells United in February 1957. New Brentford manager Malky McDonald re-signed Newton in July 1957, as backup for Gerry Cakebread and Sonny Feehan. He failed to make an appearance during the 1957–58 season and was transfer-listed in May 1958. Newton ended his career with spells at Southern League clubs Yiewsley and Chelmsford City.

Personal life 
Upon the outbreak of the Second World War, Newton joined the Army and was trained at Aldershot to be a PT instructor. While at Aldershot he was friends with Frank Swift, Denis Compton, Bill Shankly and Matt Busby. During and after his later years as a player at Brentford, Newton worked as a decorator. He died in November 1976, at the age of 50.

Career statistics

References

1926 births
1976 deaths
Association football goalkeepers
Brentford F.C. players
Chelmsford City F.C. players
English Football League players
English footballers
Hillingdon Borough F.C. players
Leyton Orient F.C. players
Footballers from the London Borough of Tower Hamlets
Southern Football League players
Tunbridge Wells F.C. players
British Army personnel of World War II
Royal Army Physical Training Corps soldiers
Kent Football League (1894–1959) players
Military personnel from Middlesex